Truther may refer to:
 9/11 truth movement member or believer
 Truther, a believer in conspiracy theories

See also
Among the Truthers, a 2011 book about conspiracy theorists
 Birtherism